Jan-Izak de Villiers (born 6 May 2001) is a Namibian cricketer and field hockey player. In May 2019, he was named in Namibia's squad for the Regional Finals of the 2018–19 ICC T20 World Cup Africa Qualifier tournament in Uganda. Prior to his selection in the T20I team, he was named in Namibia's squads for the 2018 Under-19 Cricket World Cup and the 2019 ICC World Cricket League Division Two tournament.

In December 2019, he was one of three rookie players to be awarded a national contract with the Namibia cricket team. Later the same month, he was named in Namibia's One Day International (ODI) squad for the 2020 Oman Tri-Nation Series. He made his ODI debut for Namibia, against Oman, on 8 January 2020. He made his Twenty20 debut for Namibia, against Ireland Wolves, on 21 February 2020, during their tour to South Africa.

References

External links

2001 births
Living people
Namibian cricketers
Namibia One Day International cricketers
Namibia male field hockey players
Place of birth missing (living people)
Field hockey players at the 2018 African Youth Games